Yasmeen Sami Alamiri is an Iraqi American journalist. She currently serves as the digital news editor for PBS NewsHour.

Alamiri became a White House correspondent in 2007 for the Saudi Press Agency. In that capacity, Alamiri was the first member of the White House foreign press pool. She has covered both U.S. domestic politics and U.S. policy in the Middle East for organizations such as Rare, BBC, WJLA-TV, Al Arabiya, and Fair Observer. She currently serves on the Board of Directors for The Education for Peace in Iraq Center (EPIC).

She is a graduate of James Madison University and American University.

References

External links

Living people
American reporters and correspondents
American University alumni
James Madison University alumni
American people of Iraqi descent
American Muslims
American women journalists
Place of birth missing (living people)
Year of birth missing (living people)
21st-century American women